The University of Charleston (UC) is a private non-profit university with its main campus in Charleston, West Virginia. The university also has a location in Beckley, West Virginia, known as UC-Beckley.

History
The school was founded in 1888 as the Barboursville Seminary of the Southern Methodist Church. In 1901, it was renamed Morris Harvey College, in honor of a devoted supporter.

In 1935 the school moved to downtown Charleston and affiliated with the Mason College of Fine Arts and Music. In 1940, it became independent of the Methodist Church. In 1947, the school moved to its present campus in the Kanawha City section of Charleston across the river from the State Capitol. In 1951, it purchased the Young-Noyes House as the home of the college president. It was listed on the National Register of Historic Places in 1978.

The college fell on hard times after the end of the military draft and college deferment during the Vietnam War and offered itself to the state in 1975, which refused the gift. In December 1978, the school changed its name to the University of Charleston. Beginning with the inauguration of President Dr. Edwin H. Welch in 1989, the school has undergone a physical and academic transformation. Four new residence halls, a parking garage, a fitness center, an academic building housing the library, computer and science labs, and a new school of pharmacy have been built since 1998.

UC established campuses on Mountain State University's former Beckley and Martinsburg, West Virginia, locations on January 1, 2013. UC later vacated the former MSU Martinsburg campus (the property was sold to a third-party buyer), and established a new location in Martinsburg, known as UC-Martinsburg. UC vacated the former MSU Beckley campus after the 2014–15 academic year and established a new campus in Beckley.

On December 15, 2017, the board of trustees named Martin S. Roth to succeed Dr. Edwin Welch as the president of the university. He began on June 30, 2018. Roth left his position as the dean of the business school at the University of Hartford.

Academics
The University of Charleston is accredited by the Higher Learning Commission.

The university employs a unique outcomes-based model of education whereby students learn and master six competencies by graduation: citizenship, communication, creativity, critical thinking, ethical practice, and science.

There are over twenty undergraduate major programs at UC, with two majors being somewhat unusual to the region, with few other colleges offering similar programs: interior design and radiologic science. Besides these two programs, other top majors at UC include English, sports administration, education, communications, accounting, nursing, and athletic training.

Rankings
In 2012, UC was ranked 14th by U.S. News & World Report for regional colleges in the South. In 2011, UC was the top ranked regional college in West Virginia, according to U.S. News & World Report.

Graduate schools
In 2006, UC opened its first doctoral program, the UC School of Pharmacy. In 2008, the university opened a graduate business school which grants four business master's degrees: Master of Business Administration and Leadership (MBAL), Executive Master of Business Administration (EMBA), Executive Master of Business Administration with a concentration in Pharmaceutical & Healthcare Management (EMBA- PHM),  and Executive Master of Forensic Accounting (EMFA).

In 2012, the school announced a new Physician Assistant program.

Athletics

UC's athletic teams, known as the Golden Eagles, mostly compete in the Mountain East Conference (MEC) in NCAA Division II. In June 2012, UC was one of nine members of the West Virginia Intercollegiate Athletic Conference (WVIAC) that announced their plans to leave to form a new Division II conference. Two months later, the new conference was unveiled as the MEC, with UC as one of 12 charter members. The men's volleyball team, which was elevated from a club team to full varsity status for the 2015 season (2014–15 school year), plays at the National Collegiate (Division I/II) level; after playing in 2015 as an independent, it joined the Eastern Intercollegiate Volleyball Association. University of Charleston achieved its first division II national championship in men's soccer in 2017 defeating Lynn University in the finals.

In 2005, UC entered into a partnership with the local school board to refurbish the school board–owned Laidley Field, which was renamed University of Charleston Stadium. The campus also boasts new or renovated softball, football, baseball, and soccer fields, and competes in 18 Division II sports.

Notable alumni

References

External links

 
University of Charleston Athletics website

 
University of Charleston
Educational institutions established in 1888
University of Charleston
Education in Kanawha County, West Virginia
Buildings and structures in Kanawha County, West Virginia
Tourist attractions in Kanawha County, West Virginia
1888 establishments in West Virginia